The voiced lateral click is a click consonant found primarily among the languages of southern Africa.

In languages which use the Bantu letters for clicks, this is most commonly written , but it is written  in those languages that use  for the uvular fricative.

Features

Features of the voiced lateral click:

Occurrence
Voiced lateral clicks are found primarily in the various Khoisan language families of southern Africa and in some neighboring Bantu languages.

References

Click consonants
Lateral consonants
Voiced oral consonants